The Araucárias Biological Reserve is a biological reserve in the state of Paraná, Brazil.
It contains a sample of the Atlantic Forest biome, a remnant of the Araucária forest.

Formation

It is administered by the Chico Mendes Institute for Biodiversity Conservation.
It contains a sample of the Atlantic Forest biome.
It covers parts of the Fernandes Pinheiro, Imbituva, Ipiranga and Teixeira Soares municipalities in the state of Paraná.
The purpose is to fully preserve the biota without direct human interference.

Status

The Araucárias Biological Reserve is one of the last remaining areas in the Araucária forest with conservation potential.
It is home to endangered species and archaeological sites.
The area holds significant areas of floodplains, swamps and gallery forest.
The reserve is a "strict nature reserve" under IUCN protected area category Ia.

Notes

Sources

2006 establishments in Brazil
Biological reserves of Brazil
Protected areas of Paraná (state)
Protected areas established in 2006
Protected areas of the Atlantic Forest